Lapland is a Finnish constituency represented in the eduskunta. It covers the administrative region of Lapland, with a population, as of its most recent accessible calculation in 2002, of 187,777. Lapland currently elects seven members to the eduskunta.The constituency is largely rural, and the only cities in the area are small. Thus, the dominant party has traditionally been the rural Centre Party. The second party that holds major influence in the area is the SKDL/Left Alliance. The other two major Finnish parties, the social democratic SDP and conservative NCP have usually received one of the seats in the constituency. The NCP has often allied with the Christian Democrats.

Members of parliament

2015–2019
 Katri Kulmuni (Centre)
 Mikko Kärnä (Centre)
 Eeva-Maria Maijala (Centre)
 Hanna Mäntylä (True Finns, since June 2017 Blue Reform) Minister of Social Affairs and Health 2015-2016, retired June 2017
 Markus Mustajärvi (Left Alliance)
 Markus Lohi (Centre)
 Johanna Ojala-Niemelä (Social Democrats)
 Matti Torvinen (Blue Reform, nominated from True Finns), since July 2017 for Hanna Mäntylä

2019–2023
 Heikki Autto (National Coalition Party)
 Kaisa Juuso (Finns Party)
 Katri Kulmuni (Centre)
 Mikko Kärnä (Centre)
 Markus Lohi (Centre)
 Markus Mustajärvi (Left Alliance)
 Johanna Ojala-Niemelä (Social Democrats)

Election results

|}

|}

References

See also
 Constituencies of Finland

Parliament of Finland electoral districts
Lapland (Finland)